O Tempo dos Leopardos is a 1985 war drama. It is a Yugoslav-Mozambican co-production directed by Zdravko Velimirović. O Tempo dos Leopardos was the first Mozambican feature film.

Cast 
 Ana Magaia as Ana
 Armando Loja as Armando
 Santos Mulungo as Pedro
 Simiao Mazuze as Januario
 Marcelino Alves as Vasco

Credits 
 Screenplay: Luis Patraquim, Branimir Šćepanović, Zdravko Velimirović
 Production design: Machado da Graca
 Stage design: Fausta Ficnocchi
 Music composer: Kornelije Kovač
 Editing:  Marko Babac
 Script supervisor: Ranka Velimirović
 1st assistant director: Camilo de Sousa
 2nd assistant director: Henrique Caldeira
 2nd assistant director: Sol de Carvalho
 Sound editor: Dragan Cenerić

Plot 
The Time of the Leopards is set Mozambique in 1971, the last days of Portuguese colonial occupation. The film is a fictional account of the anti-colonial Mozambican War of Independence told from the perspective of the colonised.

See also 
 Mozambican War of Independence

References

External links 
 
 O Tempo dos Leopardos at the Internet Archive

1985 films
Yugoslav drama films
Mozambican drama films
1985 drama films
Films directed by Zdravko Velimirović
1980s Portuguese-language films